Asaphodes cosmodora is a species of moth in the family Geometridae. This species is endemic to New Zealand and has been observed in the South Island. The adults of this species are on the wing in January and February.

Taxonomy
A. cosmodora was described by Edward Meyrick in 1888 as Larentia cosmodora using material he collected at Gordon's Pyramid on Mount Arthur in January. George Hudson also discussed this species under the name Xanthorhoe clarata in both 1898 and in 1928. In 1971 J. S. Dugdale confirmed the placement of this species in the genus Asaphodes. In 1988 Dugdale confirmed this placement in his catalogue of New Zealand Lepidoptera. Dugdale also proposed that the species Asaphodes bryopis be synonymised with A. cosmodora. The female holotype specimen is held at the Natural History Museum, London.

Description
Meyrick originally described the species as follows:

Distribution
This species is endemic to New Zealand. Along with mountainous areas in the Kahurangi National Park, this species has also been found in the Dansey ecological district in Otago at altitudes of between 1000 and 1300 m.

Biology and life cycle
A. cosmodora can be found on the wing in January and February.

References

Moths described in 1888
Moths of New Zealand
Larentiinae
Endemic fauna of New Zealand
Taxa named by Edward Meyrick
Endemic moths of New Zealand